McBath is a surname. Notable people with the surname include:

Darcel McBath (born 1985), American football player
Lucy McBath (born 1960), American politician
Mark McBath (born 1957), American football player
Mike McBath (born 1946), American football player and businessman

See also
McMath